East India Comedy was a group of 7 Indian stand-up comedians that performed comedy shows, organized comedy workshops and corporate events, and scripts movies and television shows. The group claimed to be India's busiest comedy company with a record 130 shows across the country in the calendar year 2013. East India Comedy maintained a YouTube channel that showcased their comedy stints and satires on topics like politics, religion and the Indian film industry. Much of their reputation was initiated through their online presence. The group used to host India’s version of the Golden Raspberry Awards (Razzies), the Ghanta Awards.

Members
Sorabh Pant, Founder (left, 2017)
Kunal Rao, Co-founder (left, 2019)
Sapan Verma, Co-founder
Sahil Shah, Co-founder
Angad Singh Ranyal
Azeem Banatwalla
Atul Khatri (left, 2017)

History
In 2012, East India Comedy was founded by Sorabh Pant along with Kunal Rao, Sapan Verma and Sahil Shah. Later in the same year, the group was joined by Azeem Banatwalla, and Angad Singh Ranyal.

EIC is among the pioneering comedy groups in India which, along with Tanmay Bhat's All India Bakchod, is responsible for a complete revamping of the Indian comedy scene.

In 2017, Sorabh Pant and Atul Khatri left EIC to pursue their solo careers. In 2019, Kunal Rao left the comedy group.

See also
All India Bakchod
The Viral Fever

References

YouTube channels
Comedy collectives